Michał Zych (born 28 May 1982 in Gdynia) is a Polish former competitive ice dancer. With Aleksandra Kauc, he is a three-time Polish national champion and the 2004 Golden Spin of Zagreb silver medalist. The duo competed in the final segment at three European Championships, three World Championships, and the 2006 Winter Olympics.

Career 
Early in his career, Zych competed with Agnieszka Szot.

From 2000 to 2002, he competed with Marta Dzióbek, with whom he is the 2002 Polish junior bronze medalists.

From 2003 to 2006, he competed with partner Alexandra Kauc. Kauc and Zych are three time Polish national champions. They competed three times at the European Figure Skating Championships and the  World Figure Skating Championships. They placed 21st at the 2006 Winter Olympics. After beginning the 2006–2007 season at the 2006 Nebelhorn Trophy, they ended their partnership.

Programs

With Kauc

With Dzióbek

Competitive highlights

With Kauc

With Dzióbek

References

External links 
 
 

Polish male ice dancers
Olympic figure skaters of Poland
Figure skaters at the 2006 Winter Olympics
1980 births
Living people
Sportspeople from Gdynia